This is a complete list of seasons for the Sioux Falls Skyforce.

Continental Basketball Association

International Basketball League

Continental Basketball Association

NBA D-League

Sioux Falls Skyforce